Rozalind Drummond (born 1956) is a photographic artist and an early exponent of postmodernism in Australia.

Education 
Drummond trained initially at Prahran College 1982-84, an institution which Australian Centre for Photography director Deborah Ely recognised in 1999 as producing "some of the country's most acclaimed practitioners" including Drummond amongst them, beside "Bill Henson, Carol Jerrems, Steve Lojewski, Janina Green and Christopher Koller". From 1985–86 she undertook a Post Graduate Diploma in Fine Art at the School of Art in the Victorian College of the Arts where Bill Henson, as noted by Max Dupain, was her supervisor.

In 1997 she was awarded a Samstag Scholarship of  A$30,000, plus airfares and fees, for a year of overseas study during which she took an MA in Fine Art at Goldsmiths College, London. Co-recipients were Zhong Chen, Lyndal Jefferies, Steven Holland, and Julie Gough. Later in Australia she completed a Master of Arts (Art in Public Space), RMIT University, Melbourne in 2017. Since then she has exhibited nationally and internationally and her work is in major public collections.

From 1986-88 Drummond was Assistant Director at George Paton Gallery, University of Melbourne, and she has held academic positions as Lecturer in Photography, Victorian College of the Arts, School of Art, Melbourne 1987-89,  Lecturer in Photography, School of Art and Design, Monash University, Caulfield Campus 1990-91 and Lecturer in Photography, School of Arts and Education, Deakin University, Burwood Campus until 2014.

Practice 
Drummond first showed solo in 1985 at George Paton Gallery (where she was to become assistant director the following year).

Less than ten years into her career, in 1993, Drummond and painter Geoff Lowe were invited by curator Juliana Engberg to produce an exhibition involving collaboration with Vietnamese artists supported by Asialink's Australian art to Asia project and hosted by the Hanoi School of Art, the nation's first contemporary art contact with Vietnam. Choosing to show typical examples of their Australian contemporary art practice, Drummond took long contact proofs, titled Voyeur and excepted from monochrome Super 8 footage which had been made between 1960–65, which could be unrolled and pinned to the gallery wall either horizontally or vertically, allowing viewers' own interpretation of narrative, and reported that some of the Vietnamese artists were surprised she chose not to frame her photographs.

The exhibition was shown in Australia as Vietnam at the Waverley City Gallery from 25 February to 28 March 1993, in which Zara Stanhope points to "Drummond's creative acts of framing and filming," and "unsettling juxtaposition of unfamiliar, geographically distant images" which "disrupt the convention of the invisible journalistic photographer [and] Western modes of narrative and brings about reconsideration of viewing responsibilities." Drummond also included a series of untitled black-and-white photos extracted from an unfinished video she made in Vietnam in which scenes in motion were rendered blurred and out of focus. A single framed passport photo facing a group of like images at opposite ends of a long narrow space that for Stanhope signify "the individual made poweriess before structures of the mass or of nation. The passport proves the existence of the refugee and reminds us that those who cross frontiers are, like criminals, the objects ol surveillance."

Drummond's Peeping Tom (named from Michael Powell’s film) was shown at Monash University Gallery, November 1995 to February 1996. Beside found photographs it included three video screens; one showing Powell's 1960 movie; another voyeuristically tracking a woman as she weaves through museum displays; and a third with a live feed of the exhibition space in which the viewer can see themselves recorded. The sum of these parts places the audience in the role of victim and aggressor simultaneously. It is a frequently referenced work, early on by artist and writer Perry Fowler;"Drummond has created an ‘artificial’, cryptically narrated, masculinist subjectivity. Like a psychoanalyst ‘reading’ a patient or a detective investigating a mystery, the viewer deciphers the story through ‘clues’ provided at random.The story reveals an arguably pathological perception of the feminine. Drummond’s women are shallow, monochrome beauties, naively modeling for long-forgotten amateurs. Manipulated and enlarged, they become images of a reconstituted femininity; a postmodern perception of a post-war sexuality."

Reception  
Reviewers recognised an allusive and elliptical gaze in Drummond's oeuvre from early on in her career, with Max Dupain in 1986 describing as "intensely introverted" her imagery in The Melbourne Stage: Photographs by four post-graduates at the Australian Centre for Photography, Sydney;"Rozalind Drummond shows 16 extremely beautiful colour pictures. As a group they are intensely poetic and charged with a very personal sense of mystery and sometimes unrelenting despair. Subdued yet passionate, delicate and sombre, thought-provoking and slightly awesome, they could all be shifting shadows of the same person. I return to these pictures again and again. In ordinary terminology they have depth. It is heartening to know that photography can thus rise so superior to actuality."Drummond's embrace of postmodernist traits prompted mixed reviews. Beatrice Faust slighted her contributions to the National Gallery of Victoria's 1988 Excursions into the Postmodern: Five Melbourne Photographers; New Acquisitions, writing that she had failed to make "a coherent body of work," and that beside John Gollings' studies "powerful melding of architectural, pornographic and optical images," hers were "sketchy and trivial." Canberra Times critic Helen Musa by contrast understood in 1992 that Drummond "uses photography to exploit the distance between the real and the fictional."

Stuart Koop ambiguously qualified such a response in comparing separate 1991 exhibitions by Drummond (Scopic Territories at Australian Centre for Contemporary Art) and Wolfgang Sievers' industrial photographs (at National Gallery of Victoria) to identify her... "...apparently total abdication of authorial responsibility in [ . . . ] a dependence on everything extrinsic to the photograph which has come to characterise the critical import of postmodern photography as some kind of institutional critique; this in contrast to the intrinsic formalism of modern photography," noting "[Sievers'] (perhaps naive) confrontation of power, capital, social control, or whatever, in the construction of aesthetic forms, [while Drummond], in retreat. hopes rather to spy a random trace of their omnipresence, poking the camera into a city's spaces for a glimpse of puissance. The difference is a capitulation of sorts before the unrelenting advance of "capital" manifest in theories such as Debord's."Greg Neville in The Age however dismissed Scopic Territories as "a cold and overstated exercise. In that at least it is a good example of the current, Post-Modern Academy style,"  its catalogue as "impenetrable" and the accompanying video as "interminable," and dismissed a reshowing of the images in Reflex at the Centre for Contemporary Photography, curated by Koop, as "blurry night shots of the city, such as one expects (but does not encourage) in undergraduate students."

Rebecca Lancashire more positive in reviewing Location, at Australian Centre for Contemporary Art in 1992, notes "Rozalind Drummond's black and white Melbourne scenes, deliberately out of focus: images of flux and uncertainty," and Zara Stanhope addressing Reflex as an exhibition of ironically "bad" photography, in which Drummond's work accompanied that of Susan Fereday, Graeme Hare, Les Walking and David Stephenson, described hers as "dynamic images;"

"Abstracting the real, the works in Reflex restage the classical struggle between the expressive and the descriptive, the subjectivity of the gaze and the indexical qualities of photographic reproduction. The electric neon lighls illuminating the form of Western and Eastern cities appear out of the night in Rozalind Drummond's...They provide the viewer with only a transitory glimpse, insufficient to discern the figure in the darkness, or to culturally position oneself."

Drummond has applied a feminist visual critique to gender. Reacting to her 1996 exhibition Bunny Rug reprising American pinup photographer Bunny Yeager's self-portraits reviewer Bruce James of the Sydney Morning Herald finds himself "unpersuaded but provoked." In a 1997 issue of ArtAsiaPacific, Natalie King described the installation Peeping Tom (1995) by Drummond as, “A group of large format, toned photographs … haphazardly pinned to the gallery walls like an archive,” suggesting not an institution but the “archive” as a collection of related things (whether in subject or form), inviting, as Freda Freiberg remarked, "a surreptitious peep, if not a studied gaze, at the bodies and business of others..." and to "turn our gaze back on the professional peepers, to play their game. We are asked to play the sleuth." However, reviewing more conventional imagery in Perfect for Every Occasion at Heide Museum of Modern Art in 2007, critic Robert Nelson dismissed as "feeble happy snaps," her portraits of youths; "Even the scene where one girl touches another, which is given the dramatic title Now Everyone Knows, seems unmomentous."

Penny Webb writing on Durmmond's 2007 collaborative show with Stuart Bailey, Carpetweed, at Victoria Park Gallery, Abbotsford, discerns a more effective "exchange ... established between these two bodies of work - six photographs pinned around the space; six constructions on the floor: a meeting of minds, you might say. Rozalind Drummond has cast a dispassionate eye on piles of materials and objects, discarded or yet to be claimed, in the process of some sort of office move or domestic upheaval."

Selected exhibitions 
Drummond's exhibitions include:

Solo 
 2018: Process blue, nature trips, corduroy, pine shelving, Bundoora Homestead Art Centre
 2011:  Black Mountain, (with Stuart Bailey) Margaret Lawrence Gallery, VCA
 2010, 16 Jun – 30 Jun: While We Were Shopping, West Space gallery
 2009:  How Fine the Air, Life Lab Building, pop-up Space, Docklands, Melbourne
 2008: Weather Everything, Canberra Contemporary Art Space, Canberra
 2008: Carpetweed (with Stuart Bailey) Victoria Park Gallery, Melbourne
 2007, 27 April - 26 May: Rozalind Drummond : weather everything, Canberra Contemporary Art Space 
 1998: Spiderbox, (with Lauren Berkowitz) Canberra Contemporary Art Space
 1999: Hide and Seek screening Birmingham Cinema, United Kingdom
 1999: Hide and Seek, exhibition Ikon Gallery Off-site Project
 1995-6: Peeping Tom, Project Room, Monash University Gallery, Melbourne
 1995: Bunny Rug, 1st Floor, Fitzroy, Melbourne
1995, 5–23 July: Faktura, Kate Daw, Troy Framstead, Elka Varga and Dana Last,  Stop 22, St Kilda
1993: Pool, Karyn Lovegrove Gallery, Prahran 
 1991, 3 Oct–10 Nov: Rozalind Drummond: Scopic Territories, curated by Juliana Engberg, Australian Centre for Contemporary Art
 1991: Shadow Zone: Rosalind Drummond, Contemporary Art Centre of South Australia
1988: Faite urbaine, Hobart
 1985, May: George Paton Gallery, University of Melbourne

Group 

 2020, 12–19 December: Hell n' Back, fundraiser Caves gallery, Melbourne
 2020: Small Mercies, Bushfire Art Fundraiser, Melbourne
 2020, 15 February–15 March: Art Aid, Gippsland Art Gallery, Victoria
 2019: The Look, National Portrait Gallery Canberra
 2018: Express Yourself, National Portrait Gallery Canberra
 2016, 15 July to 16 October: Tough and Tender, Robert Mapplethorpe, Larry Clark, Nan Goldin, Collier Schorr, Chris Burden, Rozalind Drummond and Warwick Baker, National Portrait Gallery, Australian Capital Territory
 2012, Face to face : Deakin University creative artists respond to the Deakin University art collection, Deakin University Art Gallery
2009, from 22 July: The Black Show, C3 GALLERY at Abbotsford Convent
1998, 15–31 October: Respond Red or Blue, with Lauren Berkowitz, Pat Brassington, Tara Gilbee, Marion Harper, Deborah Ostrow, Nicola Loder, Royal Melbourne Hospital
1998, 23 May–13 June: Mnemosyne or Do Humans Dream in Negative Strips,  Centre for Contemporary Photography, Fitzroy
1997, Ikon in the City Program, Ozells Street, Primary School, Brindleyplace Birmingham 
1997, August: M CP Leica Documentary Photography Exhibition, Centre for Contemporary Photography, Fitzroy.
1993, December: Reflex, Rozalind Drummond, Susan Fereday, Graeme Hare, Les Walking and David Stephenson, curated by Stuart Koop, Centre for Contemporary Photography, Fitzroy
1992: 13 Nov–20 Dec: Location, Australian Centre for Contemporary Art
1991: From the empire´s end – nine australian photographers : On the shadow line – ten Spanish photographers, with Sue Ford; Peter Elliston; Tracey Moffatt; Linda Dement; Bill Henson; Adrian Hall; Judith Ahern; Hellen Grace; Javier Vallhonrat; Chema Madoz; Toni Catany; Néstor Torrens; Gonzalo Careaga; Koldo Chamorro; Antonio Bueno; Tomy Ceballos; Ramón David; Paco Salinas, Círculo de Bellas Artes, Madrid
1986, 16 Oct–19 Nov: The Naked Image: The Nude in Recent Australian, Photography, Australian Centre for Contemporary Art
 1987, 25 August–13 September: Survey of Contemporary Australian Photography, with Polly Borland, Graeme Hare, Phillip Le Measurier, Fiona McDonald, Kevin Wilson, curated by Anna Weis and Luba Bilu, Linden Gallery, St Kilda, Victoria
1986, February/March: The Melbourne Stage: Photographs by four post-graduates, with Cassandra Lehman, Scham Ali-Elias and Fiona Macdonald, curated by Martyn Jolly,  Australian Centre for Photography, Sydney
1985: Material Pleasures, touring exhibition of fashion from the Fashion Design Council with photographs by Jacqui Henshaw, Ashley Evans, Philip Masurier, Rozalind Drummond and Kate Gollings. McClelland Gallery, Langwarrin to 17 August; Westpac Gallery, Victorian Arts Centre, 19 August to 15 September; Benalla Art Gallery, 20 September to 3 October; Shepparton Arts Centre 8 October to 22 October; La Trobe Valley Arts Centre, Morwell, 26 October to 14 November; Sale Regional Arts Centre, 15 November to 7 December.

Curator 

 2014: Kaleidoscope, Platform Contemporary Art Space, Melbourne
 2014: Wild Places, Motorworks Gallery, Melbourne
 2005: Deep Purple, Manning Clark House, Canberra
 2004: Lost in Space, ANU, School of Visual Arts, Residency, Canberra
 2002: Hard Candy, Galerie Wieland, Berlin, Germany
 2002: Ways of Living, touring Tablet Gallery, Notting Hill, London and Project Space, RMIT University, Melbourne

Collections 
 National Gallery of Victoria
 Australian National Gallery 
 National Portrait Gallery, Canberra

References 

Australian women artists
1956 births
Living people
Postmodern artists
Australian women photographers
Australian academics
Australian women curators